Reginald Waterfield  (20 December 1867 – 8 March 1967) was an Anglican priest in the 20th century.

Education and career
He was educated at Winchester and New College, Oxford, and was ordained in 1897. He was assistant master at Rugby School, then Principal of Cheltenham College, then Archdeacon of Cirencester (renamed Archdeacon of Cheltenham in 1919).  In 1919 he became Dean of Hereford, a post he held until his retirement in 1947.  He died in March 1967 aged 99 years and, following cremation, his ashes were buried in the Lady Arbour at Hereford Cathedral.

Freemasonry
Waterfield was a prominent Freemason, and served as Provincial Grand Master of Herefordshire from 1923 to 1946. The Dean Waterfield Lodge No 8089 in Hereford is named after him. He and his Bishop, Hensley Henson, were both founders of the Cantilupe Lodge No 4083, named after Thomas de Cantilupe of Hereford.

Family
Reginald Lawson Waterfield (1900-1986), haematologist and astronomer, was his son.

References

1867 births
1967 deaths
People educated at Winchester College
Alumni of New College, Oxford
Schoolteachers from Surrey
20th-century English Anglican priests
19th-century English Anglican priests
Church of England deans
Deans of Hereford
Heads of schools in England